Toghtua Bukha may refer to:
 Tayisung Khan's personal name
Wang Toghtua Bukha, King of Shen